Enixotrophon ceciliae is a species of sea snail, a marine gastropod mollusc in the family Muricidae, the murex snails or rock snails.

Description
The shell is lightly built, lamellate, and reaches 61.4 mm in length at maturity. It has a high spire, with 6 or more broad, convex teleoconch whorls, and an impressed suture.

Distribution
This species occurs in the Pacific Ocean off Chile at a depth of 1000 m.

References

 Marshall B.A. & Houart R. (2011) The genus Pagodula (Mollusca: Gastropoda: Muricidae) in Australia, the New Zealand region and the Tasman Sea. New Zealand Journal of Geology and Geophysics 54(1): 89–114. [Published March 2011] page(s): 113

External links
 Houart, R. (2003). Description of three new species of Trophon s.l. Montfort, 1810 (Gastropoda: Muricidae) from Chile. Novapex. 4 (4): 101-110.
 Barco, A.; Marshall, B.; A. Houart, R.; Oliverio, M. (2015). Molecular phylogenetics of Haustrinae and Pagodulinae (Neogastropoda: Muricidae) with a focus on New Zealand species. Journal of Molluscan Studies. 81(4): 476-488

Gastropods described in 2003
Endemic fauna of Chile
Enixotrophon